Cachiungo or Katchiungo is a town and municipality in the province of Huambo, Angola. The municipality had a population of 120,677 in 2014.

References

Populated places in Huambo Province
Municipalities of Angola